Nikolayevsky District is an administrative and municipal district (raion), one of the seventeen in Khabarovsk Krai, Russia. It is located in the east of the krai. Its administrative center is the town of Nikolayevsk-on-Amur (which is not administratively a part of the district). Population:

Administrative and municipal status
Within the framework of administrative divisions, Nikolayevsky District is one of the seventeen in the krai. The town of Nikolayevsk-on-Amur serves as its administrative center, despite being incorporated separately as a town of krai significance—an administrative unit with the status equal to that of the districts.

As a municipal division, the district is incorporated as Nikolayevsky Municipal District, with the town of krai significance of Nikolayevsk-on-Amur being incorporated within it as Nikolayevsk-na-Amure Urban Settlement.

References

Notes

Sources

Districts of Khabarovsk Krai
